Sahakian or Sahakyan (Սահակյան) is a fairly common surname in Armenia originating from the patronymic Armenian equivalent to Isaac. Sahakian translates to Isaacson, Son of Isaac, or descendant of Isaac.

The surname can refer to the following people:

Sahakian
 Alan Sahakian, an American professor of electrical engineering and computer science
 Elvis Sahakian, an American-American businessman, founder of xenowulf a High-Performance Computing Company
 Barbara Sahakian American-born neuroscientist, based in Cambridge, UK
 Henry D. Sahakian, an Iranian-American businessman, the founder of Uni-Mart
 Jack Sahakian (1931 – 1995), an American actor
 Oshin Sahakian (b. 1986), an Iranian basketball player
 Vahram Sahakian (sometimes as Vahram Sahakyan) (born 1968), Armenian dramatist, film director and actor
 William S. Sahakian (1922– 1986), an American philosopher
 Edward Sahakian (b. 1945), an Iranian-British businessman, Namesake of The Davidoff London 40th Anniversary Whisky

Sahakyan
 Adam Sahakyan (1996–2016), sergeant of the Armed Forces of Armenia and the Nagorno-Karabakh Defense Army, killed in the Four-Day War
 Anushavan Sahakyan (born 1972), Armenian Freestyle wrestler
 Aramais Sahakyan (b. 1936), an Armenian poet and translator
 Avetik Sahakyan (1863 – 1933), former Parliamentary President of Armenia
 Bako Sahakyan (b. 1960), former president of Artsakh
 Galust Sahakyan (born 1949), Armenian politician, MP and the former President of the National Assembly of Armenia
 Gevorg Sahakyan (born 1990), Polish Greco-Roman wrestler of Armenian descent
 Norayr Sahakyan (b. 1987), an Armenian football player

Saakian
 Sumbat Saakian (1951–1993), a politician in the Government of Abkhazian Autonomous Republic

Saakyan
Mariya Saakyan (1980-2018), Russian film director

Ter-Sahakyan
Samvel Ter-Sahakyan (born 1993), Armenian chess grandmaster

See also
Armenian surnames
Isaac of Armenia

References

Armenian-language surnames
Patronymic surnames